MCM Groupe is a French television company, owned by Groupe M6, one of the largest media companies in Europe.

Television channels

Current channels 
MCM Group manages all the music television channels of M6 Group:
 MCM
 RFM TV
 MCM Top

Defunct channels 
  (Replaced by Trace Urban and sold to Modern Times Group)
 Virgin 17 (Sold to Bolloré and replaced by Direct Star then Bollore sold the channel to Canal+ Group and replaced by D17
  (Closed on December 31, 2009)
 MCM Pop (Replaced by RFM TV)
  (Merged with Mezzo TV after MCM Group was acquired by Lagardère Active to become Mezzo as international TV Channel in Europe)
 Mezzo was acquired by Groupe Canal+ and Groupe Les Échos-Le Parisien
 Mezzo Live HD was acquired by Groupe Canal+ and Groupe Les Échos-Le Parisien

Administration 
 Presidents
 Jean-Pierre Ozannat ( – )
 Frédéric Schlesinger ( – )
 Christophe Sabot ( – 2008)
 Emmanuelle Guilbart (2008 – present)

References 

 
Music television channels
Television companies of France
RTL Group
Mass media companies established in 1989
French companies established in 1989
Television networks in France
Music organizations based in France